Pellegrino is a masculine Italian given name. Notable people with the name include:
Pellegrino I of Aquileia, patriarch from 1130 to 1161
Pellegrino II of Aquileia, patriarch from 1195 to 1204
Pellegrino Aretusi (ca. 1460-1523), Italian painter
Pellegrino Artusi (1820–1911), Italian author of cuisine books
Pellegrino Ascani (fl. 17th century), Italian painter
Pellegrino da San Daniele (1467–1547), Italian painter
Peregrine Laziosi or Pellegrino Laziozi (1260-1 May 1345), Italian saint
Pellegrino Morano, Italian-American mafia boss
Pellegrino Piola (1617–1640), Italian painter
Pellegrino Rossi (1787–1848), Italian politician
Pellegrino Tibaldi (1527–1596), Italian architect and artist

Italian masculine given names